The military history of Pakistan encompasses an immense panorama of conflicts and struggles extending for more than 2,000 years across areas constituting modern Pakistan and greater South Asia. The history of the modern-day military of Pakistan began in 1947, when Pakistan achieved its independence as a modern nation.

The military holds a significant place in the history of Pakistan, as the Pakistani Armed Forces have played, and continue to play, a significant role in the Pakistani establishment and shaping of the country. Although Pakistan was founded as a democracy after its independence from the British Raj, the military has remained one of the country's most powerful institutions and has on occasion overthrown democratically elected civilian governments on the basis of self-assessed mismanagement and corruption. Successive governments have made sure that the military was consulted before they took key decisions, especially when those decisions related to the Kashmir conflict and foreign policy. Political leaders of Pakistan are aware that the military has stepped into the political arena through coup d'état to establish military dictatorships, and could do so again.

The Pakistani Armed Forces were created in 1947 by division of the British Indian Army. Pakistan was given units such as the Khyber Rifles, which had seen intensive service in World Wars I and II. Many of the early leaders of the military had fought in both world wars. Military history and culture is used to inspire and embolden modern-day troops, using historic names for medals, combat divisions, and domestically produced weapons.

Since the time of independence, the military has fought three major wars with India.
It has also fought a limited conflict at Kargil with India after acquiring nuclear capabilities. In addition, there have been several minor border skirmishes with neighbouring Afghanistan. After the September 11 attacks, the military is engaged in a protracted low intensity conflict along Pakistan's western border with Afghanistan, with the Taliban and Al-Qaeda militants, as well as those who support or provide shelter to them.

In addition, Pakistani troops have also participated in various foreign conflicts, usually acting as United Nations peacekeepers. At present, Pakistan has the largest number of its personnel acting under the United Nations with the number standing at 10,173 as of 31 March 2007.

550 BCE–1857

Ancient empires

The region of modern-day Pakistan (part of British 
Raj before 1947) formed the most-populous, easternmost and richest satrapy of the Persian Achaemenid Empire for almost two centuries, starting from the reign of Darius the Great (522–485 BC). The first major conflict erupted when Alexander the Great overthrew the Achaemenid Empire in 334 BCE and marched eastwards. After defeating King Porus in the fierce Battle of the Hydaspes (near modern Jhelum), he conquered much of the Punjab region. But his battle weary troops refused to advance further into India to engage the formidable army of the Nanda Dynasty and its vanguard of elephants, new monstrosities to the invaders. Therefore, Alexander proceeded southwest along the Indus valley. Along the way, he engaged in several battles with smaller kingdoms before marching his army westward across the Makran desert towards modern Iran. Alexander founded several new Macedonian/Greek settlements in Gandhara and Punjab.

As Alexander the Great's Greek and Persian armies withdrew westwards, the satraps left behind by Alexander were defeated and conquered by Chandragupta Maurya, who founded the Maurya Empire, which ruled the region from 321 to 185 BC. The Mauryas Empire was itself conquered by the Shunga Empire, which ruled the region from 185 to 73 BC. Other regions such as the Khyber Pass were left unguarded, and a wave of foreign invasion followed. The Greco-Bactrian king, Demetrius, capitalised and conquered southern Afghanistan and Pakistan around 180 BC, forming the Indo-Greek Kingdom. The Indo-Greek Kingdom ultimately disappeared as a political entity around 10 AD following the invasions of the Central Asian Indo-Scythians. Their empire morphed into the Kushan Empire who ruled until 375 AD. The region was then conquered by the Persian Indo-Sassanid Empire which ruled large parts of it until 565 AD.

Muslim conquests

In 712 CE, a Syrian Muslim chieftain called Muhammad bin Qasim conquered most of the Indus region (stretching from Sindh to Multan) for the Umayyad Empire. In 997 CE, Mahmud of Ghazni conquered the bulk of Khorasan, marched on Peshawar in 1005, and followed it by the conquests of Punjab (1007), Balochistan (1011), Kashmir (1015) and Qanoch (1017). By the end of his reign in 1030, Mahmud's empire extended from Kurdistan in the west to the Yamuna river in the east, and the Ghaznavid dynasty lasted until 1187. In 1160, Muhammad Ghori conquered Ghazni from the Ghaznavids and became its governor in 1173. He marched eastwards into the remaining Ghaznavid territory and Gujarat in the 1180s, but was rebuffed by Gujarat's Solanki rulers. In 1186–87, he conquered Lahore, bringing the last of Ghaznevid territory under his control and ending the Ghaznavid Empire. Muhammad Ghori returned to Lahore after 1200 to deal with a revolt of the Rajput Ghakkar tribe in the Punjab. He suppressed the revolt, but was killed during a Ghakkar raid on his camp on the Jhelum River in 1206. Muhammad Ghori's successors established the first Indo-Islamic dynasty, the Delhi Sultanate. The Mamluk Dynasty, (mamluk means "slave" and referred to the Turkic slave soldiers who became rulers throughout the Islamic world), seized the throne of the Sultanate in 1211. Several Turko-Afghan dynasties ruled their empires from Delhi: the Mamluk (1211–1290), the Khalji (1290–1320), the Tughlaq (1320–1413), the Sayyid (1414–1451) and the Lodhi (1451–1526). Although some kingdoms remained independent of Delhi – in Gujarat, Malwa (central India), Bengal and Deccan – almost all of the Indus plain came under the rule of these large Indo-Islamic sultanates. Perhaps the greatest contribution of the sultanate was its temporary success in insulating South Asia from the Mongol invasion from Central Asia in the 13th century; nonetheless the sultans eventually lost Afghanistan and western Pakistan to the Mongols (see the Ilkhanate Dynasty).

Mughal Empire

From the 16th to the 19th century, the formidable Mughal empire covered much of India. In 1739, the Persian emperor Nader Shah invaded India, defeated the Mughal Emperor Muhammad Shah, and occupied most of Balochistan and the Indus plain. After Nadir Shah's death, the kingdom of Afghanistan was established in 1747 by one of his generals, Ahmad Shah Abdali, and included Kashmir, Peshawar, Daman, Multan, Sindh and Punjab. In the south, a succession of autonomous dynasties (the Daudpotas, Kalhoras and Talpurs) had asserted the independence of Sind, from the end of Aurangzeb's reign. Most of Balochistan came under the influence of the Khan of Kalat, apart from some coastal areas such as Gwadar, which were ruled by the Sultan of Oman. The Sikh Confederacy (1748–1799) was a group of small states in the Punjab that emerged in a political vacuum created by rivalry between the Mughals, Afghans and Persians. The Confederacy drove out the Mughals, repelled several Afghan invasions and in 1764 captured Lahore. However, after the retreat of Ahmed Shah Abdali, the Confederacy suffered instability as disputes and rivalries emerged. The Sikh empire (1799–1849) was formed on the foundations of the Confederacy by Ranjit Singh who proclaimed himself "Sarkar-i-Wala", and was referred to as the Maharaja of Lahore. His empire eventually extended as far west as the Khyber Pass and as far south as Multan. Amongst his conquests were Kashmir in 1819 and Peshawar in 1834, although the Afghans made two attempts to recover Peshawar. After the Maharaja's death the empire was weakened by internal divisions and political mismanagement. The British annexed the Sikh Empire in 1849 after the Second Anglo-Sikh War.

1857–1947

British Raj

The British Raj ruled from 1858 to 1947, the period when India was part of the British Empire. Following the famous Sepoy Mutiny, the British took steps to avoid further rebellions taking place including changing the structure of the Army. They banned Indians from the officer corp and artillery corp to ensure that future rebellions would not be as organised and disciplined and that the ratio of British soldiers to Indians would be drastically increased. Recruiting percentages changed with an emphasis on Sikhs and Gurkhas whose loyalties and fighting prowess had been proven in the conflict and new caste- and religious-based regiments were formed.

The World Wars

During World War I the British Indian Army fought in Egypt, Palestine, Mesopotamia, Gallipoli, and France and suffered very heavy casualties.

The British Indian Army's strength was about 189,000 in 1939. There were about 3,000 British officers and 1,115 Indian officers. The army was expanded greatly to fight in World War II. By 1945, the strength of the Army had risen to about two-and-a-half million. There were about 34,500 British officers and 15,740 Indian officers. The Army took part in campaigns in France, East Africa, North Africa, Syria, Tunisia, Malaya, Burma, Greece, Sicily and Italy. It suffered 179,935 casualties in the war (including 24,338 killed, 64,354 wounded, 11,762 missing and 79,481  soldiers). Many future military officers and leaders of Pakistan fought in these wars.

Birth of the modern military

On June 3, 1947, the British Government announced its plan to divide British India between India and Pakistan and the subsequent transfer of power to the two countries resulted in independence of Pakistan. The division of the British Indian Army occurred on June 30, 1947, in which Pakistan received six armoured, eight artillery and eight infantry regiments compared to the forty armoured, forty artillery and twenty-one infantry regiments that went to India. At the Division Council, which was chaired by Rear Admiral Lord Mountbatten of Burma, the Viceroy of India, and was composed of the leaders of the Muslim League and the Indian National Congress, they had agreed that the British Indian Army of 11,800 officers and 500,000 enlisted personnel was to be divided to the ratio of 64% for India and 36% for Pakistan.

Pakistan was forced to accept a smaller share of the armed forces as most of the military assets, such as weapons depots, military bases, etc., were located inside the new Dominion of India, while those that were in the new Dominion of Pakistan were mostly obsolete. Pakistan also had a dangerously low ammunition reserve of only one week. By August 15, 1947, both India and Pakistan had operational control over their armed forces. General Sir Frank Messervy was appointed as the first Army Commander-in-Chief of the new Pakistan Army. General Messervy was succeeded in this post in February 1948, by General Sir Douglas Gracey, who served until January 1951.

The Pakistani Armed Forces initially numbered around 150,000 men, many scattered around various bases in India and needing to be transferred to Pakistan by train. The independence created large-scale communal violence in India. In total, around 7 million Muslims migrated to Pakistan and 5 million Sikhs and Hindus to India with over a million people dying in the process.

Of the estimated requirement of 4,000 officers for Pakistani Armed Forces, only 2,300 were actually available. The neutral British officers were asked to fill in the gap and nearly 500 volunteered along with many Polish and Hungarian officers to run the medical corps.

By October 1947, Pakistan had raised four divisions in West Pakistan and one division in East Pakistan with an overall strength of ten infantry brigades and one armoured brigade with thirteen tanks. Many brigades and battalions within these divisions were below half strength, but Pakistani personnel continued to arrive from all over India, the Middle East and North Africa and from South East Asia. Mountbatten and Field Marshal Sir Claude Auchinleck, the last Commander-in-Chief, India, had made it clear to Pakistan that in case of war with India, no other member of the Commonwealth would come to Pakistan's aid.

1947–1965

The war of 1947

Pakistan experienced combat almost immediately in the First Kashmir War when it sent its forces into Kashmir. Kashmir had a Muslim majority population, but the choice of which country to join was given to Maharaja Hari Singh who was unable to decide whether to join India or Pakistan.  By late October, the overthrow of the maharaja seemed imminent. He sought military assistance from India, for which he signed an instrument of accession with India. The Pakistan army was pushed back by the Indians but not before taking control of the northwestern part of Kashmir (roughly 40% of Kashmir), which Pakistan still controls, the rest remaining under Indian control except for the portion ceded by Pakistan to China.

US aid

With the failure of the United States to persuade India to join an anti-communist pact, it turned towards Pakistan, which in contrast with India was prepared to join such an alliance in return of military and economic aid and also to find a potential ally against India. By 1954, the US had decided that Pakistan along with Turkey and Iran would be ideal countries to counter Soviet influence. Therefore, Pakistan and the US signed the Mutual Defense Assistance Agreement and American aid began to flow into Pakistan. This was followed by two more agreements. In 1955, Pakistan joined the South East Asian Treaty Organization (SEATO) and the Baghdad Pact, later renamed the Central Asian Treaty Organization (CENTO) when Iraq withdrew in 1959.

Pakistan received over a billion dollars in US military aid between 1954 and 1965. This aid greatly enhanced Pakistan's defence capability as new equipment and weapons were brought into the armed forces, new military bases were created, existing ones were expanded and upgraded, and two new Corps commands were formed. Shahid M Amin, who had served in the Pakistani foreign service, wrote, "It is also a fact, that these pacts did undoubtedly secure very substantial US military and economic assistance for Pakistan in its nascent years and significantly strengthened it in facing India, as seen in the 1965 war."

American and British advisers trained Pakistani personnel and the US was allowed to create bases within Pakistan's borders to spy on the Soviet Union. In this period, many future Pakistani presidents and generals went to American and British military academies, which led to the Pakistan army developing along Western models, especially following the British.

After Dominion status ended in 1956 with the formation of a Constitution and a declaration of Pakistan as an Islamic Republic, the military took control in 1958 and held power for more than 10 years. During this time, Pakistan had developed close military relations with many Middle Eastern countries to which Pakistan sent military advisers, a practice which continues into the 21st century.

First military rule
In 1958, retired Major-General and President Iskander Mirza took over the country, deposed the government of Prime Minister Feroz Khan Noon, and declared martial law on October 7, 1958. President Mirza personally appointed his close associate General Ayub Khan as the Commander-in-Chief of Pakistan's army. However, Khan ousted Mirza when he became highly dissatisfied by Mirza's policies. As president and commander-in-chief, Ayub Khan appointed himself a 5-star Field Marshal and built relationships with the United States and the West. A formal alliance including Pakistan, Iran, Iraq, and Turkey was formed and was called the Baghdad Pact (later known as CENTO), which was to defend the Middle East and Persian Gulf from Soviet communists designs.

Border clashes with Afghanistan

Armed tribal incursions from Afghanistan into Pakistan's border areas began with the transfer of power in 1947 and became a continual irritant. Many Pashtun Afghans regarded the 19th century Anglo-Afghan border treaties (historically called the Durand Line) as void and were trying to re-draw the borders with Pakistan or to create an independent state (Pashtunistan) for the ethnic Pashtun people. The Pakistan Army had to be continually sent to secure the country's western borders. Afghan–Pakistan relations were to reach their lowest points in 1955 when diplomatic relations were severed with the ransacking of Pakistan's embassy in Kabul and again in 1961 when the Pakistan Army had to repel a major Afghan incursion in Bajaur region.

Pakistan used American weaponry to fight the Afghan incursions but the weaponry had been sold under the pretext of fighting Communism and the US was not pleased with this development, as the Soviets at that time became the chief benefactor to Afghanistan. Some sections of the American press blamed Pakistan for driving Afghanistan into the Soviet camp.

Alliance with China

After India's defeat in the Sino-Indian War of 1962, India began a rapid program of reforming and expanding its military. A series of conferences on Kashmir was held from December 1962 to February 1963 between India and Pakistan. Both nations offered important concessions and a solution to the long-standing dispute seemed imminent. However, after the Sino-Indian war, Pakistan had gained an important new ally in China and Pakistan then signed a bilateral border agreement with China that involved the boundaries of the disputed state, and relations with India again became strained.

Fearing a communist expansion into India, the US for the first time gave large quantities of weapons to India. The expansion of the Indian armed forces was viewed by most Pakistanis as being directed towards Pakistan rather than China. The US also pumped in large sums of money and military supplies to Pakistan as it saw Pakistan as being a check against Soviet expansionist plans.

1965–1979

The War of 1965

Pakistan viewed the military of India as being weakened following the Sino-Indian War in 1962. A small border skirmish between India and Pakistan in the Rann of Kutch in April 1965 caught the Indian Army unprepared. The skirmish occurred between the border police of both countries due to poorly defined borders and later the armies of both countries responded. The result was decisive for the Pakistan army which was commended at home. Emboldened by this success, Operation Gibraltar, an infiltration attempt in Kashmir, was launched later that year. Rebellion was fostered among local Kashmiris to attack the Indian Army. Pakistan Army  had a qualitative superiority over their neighbours. This caused a full-fledged war across the international border (the Indo-Pakistani War of 1965) broke out between India and Pakistan. The air forces of both countries engaged in massive air warfare. While on the offensive both armies occupied some of the other country's territory, resulting in a stalemate, but both sides claim victory.

The US had imposed an arms embargo on both India and Pakistan during the war and Pakistan was affected more as it lacked spare parts for its Air Force, tanks, and other equipment, while India's quantitative edge making up for theirs. The war ended in a ceasefire.

Rebuilding the Armed Forces
The US was disillusioned by a war in which both countries fought each other with equipment which had been sold for defensive purposes and to stop the spread of communism. Pakistan claimed that it was compelled to act by the Indian attempt to fully integrate Indian-controlled Kashmir into the union of India, but this had little impact to the Johnson Administration and by July 1967, the US withdrew its military assistance advisory group. In response to these events, Pakistan declined to renew the lease on the Peshawar military facility, which ended in 1969. Eventually, US–Pakistan relations grew measurably weaker as the US became more deeply involved in Vietnam and as its broader interest in the security of South Asia waned.

The Soviet Union continued the massive build-up of the Indian military and a US arms embargo forced Pakistan to look at other options. It turned to China, North Korea, Germany, Italy and France for military aid. China in particular gave Pakistan over 900 tanks, Mig-19 fighters and enough equipment for three infantry divisions. France supplied some Mirage aircraft, submarines. The Soviet Union gave Pakistan around 100 T-55 tanks and Mi-8 helicopters but that aid was abruptly stopped under intense Indian pressure. Pakistan in this period was partially able to enhance its military capability.

Involvement in Arab conflicts

Pakistan had sent numerous military advisers to Jordan and Syria to help in their training and military preparations for any potential war with Israel. When the Six-Day War started, Pakistan assisted by sending a contingent of its pilots and airmen to Egypt, Jordan and Syria. PAF pilots downed about 10 Israeli planes including Mirages, Mysteres and Vautours without losing a single plane of their own.

Jordan and Iraq decorated East Pakistani Flight Lieutenant Saif-ul-Azam. Israelis also praised the performance of PAF pilots. Eizer Weizman, then Chief Of Israeli Air Force wrote in his autobiography about Air Marshal Noor Khan (Commander PAF at that time): "...He is a formidable person and I am glad that he is Pakistani and not Egyptian." No Pakistani ground forces participated in the war.

After the end of the Six-Day War, Pakistani advisors remained to train the Jordanian forces. In 1970, King Hussein of Jordan decided to remove the PLO from Jordan by force after a series of terrorist acts attributed to the PLO, which undermined Jordanian sovereignty. On September 16, King Hussein declared martial law. The next day, Jordanian tanks attacked the headquarters of Palestinian organisations in Amman. The head of Pakistan's training mission to Jordan, Brigadier-General Zia-ul-Haq (later President of Pakistan), took command of the Jordanian Army's 2nd division and helped Jordan during this crisis.

Pakistan again assisted during the Yom Kippur War, sixteen PAF pilots volunteered for service in the Air Forces of Egypt and Syria. The PAF contingent deployed to Inchas Air Base (Egypt) led by Wing Commander Masood Hatif and five other pilots plus two air defence controllers. During this war, the Syrian government decorated Flight Lieutenant Sattar Alvi when he shot down an Israeli Mirage over the Golan Heights. The PAF pilots then became instructors in the Syrian Air Force at Dumayr Air Base and after the war Pakistan continued to send military advisers to Syria and Jordan. Apart from military advisers, no Pakistani ground forces participated in this war.

In 1969, South Yemen, which was under a communist regime and a strong ally of the USSR, attacked and captured Mount Vadiya inside the province of Sharoora in Saudi Arabia. Many PAF officers as well Army personnel who were serving in Khamis Mushayt training the Saudi Air Force (the closest airbase to the battlefield), took active part in this battle in which the enemy was ultimately driven back.

The War of 1971

The first democratic elections in Pakistan were held in 1970 with the Awami League (AL) winning a substantial majority in East Pakistan while the Pakistan Peoples Party (PPP) won a majority in West Pakistan.  However talks on sharing power failed and President Yahya Khan declared martial law.  PPP leader Zulfikar Ali Bhutto had refused to accept an AL government and declared he would "break the legs" of any of his party members who attended the National Assembly. Capitalizing on West Pakistani fears of East Pakistani separatism, Bhutto demanded to form a coalition with AL leader Sheikh Mujibur Rahman. They agreed upon a coalition government, with Bhutto as president and Mujibur as prime minister, and put political pressure on Khan's military government. Pressured by the military, Khan postponed the inaugural session, and ordered the arrests of Mujibur and Bhutto.

Faced with popular unrest and revolt in East-Pakistan, the army and navy attempted to impose order. Khan's military government ordered Rear-Admiral Mohammad Shariff, Commander of Eastern Naval Command of the Pakistan Navy, and Lieutenant-General Amir Abdullah Khan Niazi, Commander of the Eastern Military Command of Pakistan Army, to curb and liberate East Pakistan from the resistance. The navy and army crackdown and brutalities during Operation Searchlight and Operation Barisal and the continued killings throughout the later months resulted in further resentment among the East Pakistanis. With India assisting and funding the Mukti Bahini, war broke out between the separatist supporters in Bangladesh and Pakistan (Indo-Pakistani War of 1971). During the conflict, the co-ordination between the armed forces of Pakistan were ineffective and unsupported. The army, navy, marines and air force were not consulted in major decisions, and each force led their own independent operations without notifying the higher command. To release the pressure from East Pakistan the Pakistan Army opened new front on the western sector when a 2,000-strong Pakistani force attacked the Indian outpost at Longewala held by 120 Indian soldiers of 23 Punjab regiment. The attack was backed by a tank regiment but without air support. The battle was decisively won by the Indian army with the help of the Indian Air Force, and was an example of poor co-ordination by Pakistan.

The result was the Pakistan Armed Forces's surrender to the allied forces upon which 93,000 soldiers, officers and civilians became POWs. The official war between India and Pakistan ended after a fortnight on December 16, 1971, with Pakistan losing East Pakistan, which became Bangladesh.

Recovery from the 1971 War
The military government collapsed as a result of the war, and control of the country was handed over to the Zulfikar Ali Bhutto. Bhutto became the country's first Chief Martial Law Administrator and first Commander-in-Chief of Pakistan Armed Forces. Taking authority in January 1972, Bhutto started a nuclear deterrence programme under Munir Ahmad Khan and his adviser Abdus Salam. In July 1972, Bhutto reached the Shimla Agreement with Indira Gandhi of India, and brought back 93,000 POWs and recognised East-Pakistan as Bangladesh.

As part of re-organizing the country, Bhutto disbanded the "Commander-in-Chief" title in the Pakistan Armed Forces. He also decommissioned the Pakistan Marines as a unit of Pakistan Navy. Instead, Chiefs of Staff were appointed in the three branches and Bhutto appointed all 4 star officers as the Chief of Staff in the Pakistan Armed Forces. General Tikka Khan, infamous for his role in Bangladesh Liberation War, become the first Chief of Army Staff; Admiral Mohammad Shariff, as first 4-star admiral in the navy and as the first Chief of Naval Staff; and, Air Chief Marshal (General) Zulfiqar Ali Khan, as first 4-star air force general, and the first Chief of Air Staff. Because the co-ordination between the armed forces were unsupported and ineffective, in 1976, Bhutto also created the office of Joint Chiefs of Staff Committee for maintaining the co-ordination between the armed forces. General Muhammad Shariff, a 4-star general, was made the first Chairman of the Joint Chiefs of Staff Committee.

Pakistan's defence spending rose by 200% during the Bhutto's democratic era but the India–Pakistan military balance, which was near parity during the 1960s, was growing decisively in India's favour. Under Bhutto, the education system, foreign policy, and science policy was rapidly changed. The funding of science was exponentially increased, with classified projects at Pakistan Atomic Energy Commission and Kahuta Research Laboratories. Bhutto also funded the classified military science and engineering projects entrusted and led by Lieutenant-General Zahid Ali Akbar of the Pakistan Army Corps of Engineers.

The US lifted its arms embargo in 1975 and once again became a major source for military hardware, but by then Pakistan had become heavily dependent on China as an arms supplier. Heavy spending on defence re-energized the Army, which had sunk to its lowest morale following the debacle of the 1971 war. The high defence expenditure took money from other development projects such as education, health care and housing.

Baloch nationalist uprisings

The Baloch rebellion of the 1970s was the most-threatening civil disorder to Pakistan since Bangladesh's secession. The Pakistan Armed Forces wanted to establish military garrisons in Balochistan Province, which at that time was quite lawless and run by tribal justice. The ethnic Balochis saw this as a violation of their territorial rights. Emboldened by the stand taken by Sheikh Mujibur Rahman in 1971, the Baloch and Pashtun nationalists had also demanded their "provincial rights" from then-Prime Minister Zulfikar Ali Bhutto in exchange for a consensual approval of the Pakistan Constitution of 1973. But while Bhutto admitted the North West Frontier Province (NWFP) and Balochistan to a NAP-JUI coalition, he refused to negotiate with the provincial governments led by chief minister Ataullah Mengal in Quetta and Mufti Mahmud in Peshawar. Tensions erupted and an armed resistance began to take place.

Surveying the political instability, Bhutto's central government sacked two provincial governments within six months, arrested the two chief ministers, two governors and forty-four MNAs and MPAs, obtained an order from the Supreme Court banning the NAP and charged them all with high treason, to be tried by a specially constituted Hyderabad Tribunal of handpicked judges.

In time, the Baloch nationalist insurgency erupted and sucked the armed forces into the province, pitting the Baloch tribal middle classes against Islamabad. The sporadic fighting between the insurgency and the army started in 1973 with the largest confrontation taking place in September 1974 when around 15,000 Balochs fought the Pakistan Army, Navy and the Air Force. Following the successful recovery of ammunition in the Iraqi embassy, shipped by both Iraq and Soviet Union for the Baluchistan resistance, Naval Intelligence launched an investigation and cited that arms were smuggled from the coastal areas of Balochistan. The Navy acted immediately, and entered the conflict. Vice-Admiral Patrick Simpson, commander of Southern Naval Command, began to launch a series of operations under a naval blockade.

The Iranian military, which feared a spread of the greater Baloch resistance in Iran, aided Pakistan's military in putting down the insurrection. After three days of fighting the Baloch tribals were running out of ammunition and withdrew by 1976. The army had suffered 25 fatalities and around 300 casualties in the fight while the rebels lost 5,000 people as of 1977.

Although major fighting had broken down, ideological schisms caused splinter groups to form and steadily gain momentum. Despite the overthrow of the Bhutto government in 1977 by General Zia-ul-Haque, Chief of Army Staff, calls for secession and widespread civil disobedience remained. The military government then appointed General Rahimuddin Khan as Martial Law Administrator over the Balochistan Province. The provincial military government under the famously authoritarian General Rahimuddin began to act as a separate entity and military regime independent of the central government.

This allowed Rahimuddin Khan to act as an absolute martial law administrator, unanswerable to the central government. Both Zia-ul-Haq and Rahimuddin Khan supported the declaration of a general amnesty in Balochistan to those willing to give up arms. Rahimuddin then purposefully isolated feudal leaders such as Nawab Akbar Khan Bugti and Ataullah Mengal from provincial policy. He also put down all civil disobedience movements, effectively leading to unprecedented social stability within the province. Due to martial law, his reign (1977–1984) was the longest in the history of Balochistan.

Tensions later resurfaced in the province with the Pakistan Army being involved in attacks against an insurgency known as the Balochistan Liberation Army. Attempted uprisings have taken place as recently as 2005.

Second military rule
During the 1977 elections, rumours of widespread voter fraud led to the civilian government under Zulfikar Ali Bhutto being overthrown in a bloodless coup of July 1977 (See Operation Fair Play). The new ruler was Chief of Army Staff General Zia-ul-Haq who became Chief Martial Law Administrator in 1978. Zia-ul-Haq was appointed by Bhutto after Bhutto forced seventeen senior general officers to retire. Zia appointed Mushtaq Hussain as chief jurist for Bhutto's case. Mushtaq Hussain was publicly known to hate Bhutto, and had played a controversial role in Bhutto's removal as foreign minister in 1965. As his judge, Hussain disrespected Bhutto and his hometown and denied any appeals. Under Zia's direction and Hussain's order, Bhutto was executed in 1979 after the Supreme Court upheld the High Court's death sentence on charges of authorising the murder of a political opponent. Under Zia's military dictatorship (which was declared legal under the Doctrine of Necessity by the Supreme Court in 1978) the following initiatives were taken:
 Strict Islamic law was introduced into the country's legal system by 1978, contributing to current-day sectarianism and religious fundamentalism, and instilling a sense of religious purpose within the youth.
 Pakistan fought a war by proxy against the Communists in Afghanistan in the Soviet–Afghan War, greatly contributing to the eventual withdrawal of Soviet forces from Afghanistan.
 Secessionist uprisings in Balochistan were put down by the province's authoritarian ruler, General Rahimuddin Khan, who ruled for an unprecedented seven years under martial law.
 The socialist economic policies of the previous civilian government, which included aggressive nationalisation, were gradually reversed; Pakistan's Gross National Product rose greatly.

Zia lifted martial law in 1985, holding party-less elections and handpicking Muhammad Khan Junejo to be the Prime Minister of Pakistan, who in turn reappointed Zia as Chief of Army Staff until 1990. Junejo however gradually fell out with Zia as his political and administrative independence grew – such as by asking his Minister of State to sign the Geneva Accord, which President Zia disliked. After a large-scale explosion at a munitions store in Ojhri, Junejo vowed to bring those responsible for the significant damage caused to justice, implicating several times the Inter-Services Intelligence (ISI) Director-General Akhtar Abdur Rahman.

President Zia dismissed the Junejo government on several charges in May 1988. He then called for elections in November. Zia-ul-Haq died in a plane crash on August 17, 1988, which was later proven to be highly sophisticated sabotage by unknown perpetrators.

Under Zia, defence spending increased an average 9 percent per annum during 1977–1988 while development spending rose 3 percent per annum; by 1987–88 defence spending had overtaken development spending. For the 1980s as a whole, defence spending averaged 6.5 percent of GDP. This contributed strongly to large fiscal deficits and a rapid buildup of public debt.

1979–1999

Development of atomic bomb projects

Soon after Bhutto assumed control of Pakistan, he established nuclear weapons development. On January 20, 1972, Abdus Salam, after being requested by Zulfikar Ali Bhutto, arranged and managed a secret meeting of academic scientists and engineers with Bhutto in Multan city. It was there that Bhutto orchestrated, administered, and led the scientific research on nuclear weapons as he announced the official nuclear weapons development programme. In 1972, Pakistan's core intelligence service, the ISI, secretly learned that India was close to developing an atomic bomb, under its nuclear programme. Partially in response, defence expenditure and funding of science under then-Prime Minister Bhutto increased by 200%. In the initial years, Abdus Salam, a Nobel laureate, headed the nuclear weapons program as he was the prime minister's science adviser. He is also credited with recruiting hundreds of Pakistani scientists, engineers, and mathematicians to the nuclear weapons development program; he later formed and headed the Theoretical Physics Group (TPG), the special weapons division of the Pakistan Atomic Energy Commission (PAEC) that developed the designs of the nuclear weapons.

Throughout that time, the foundations were laid down to develop a military nuclear capability. This included the nuclear fuel cycle and nuclear weapons design, development and testing programme. The fuel cycle program included the uranium exploration, mining, refining, conversion and Uranium Hexafluoride (UF6) production, enrichment and fuel fabrication and reprocessing facilities. These facilities were established in PAEC by Munir Ahmad Khan. He was appointed PAEC Chairman on January 20, 1972 at the Multan Conference of senior scientists and engineers. Earlier, Munir Ahmad Khan was serving as Director of Nuclear Power and Reactors Division, IAEA. He was credited as the "technical father" of Pakistan's atom project by a recent International Institute of Strategic Studies, London, (IISS) dossier on history of the Pakistan's nuclear development, with Zulfikar Ali Bhutto as the father of Pakistan's nuclear developmental programme. Munir Ahmad Khan, an expert in Plutonium technology, had also laid the foundation and groundbreaking work for the Plutonium reprocessing technology. Khan, built the New Laboratories, a plutonium reprocessing plant located in Islamabad.

After Chief Martial Law Administrator (later president) and Chief of Army Staff General Zia-ul-Haq came to power (see Operation Fair Play), further advancements were made to enrich uranium and consolidate the nuclear development programme. On March 11, 1983, the PAEC under Munir Ahmad Khan carried out the first successful cold test of a working nuclear device near at the Kirana Hills under codename Kirana-I. The test was led by CERN-physicist Ishfaq Ahmad, and was witnessed by other senior scientists belonging to Pakistan Armed Forces and the PAEC. To compound matters further, the Soviet Union had withdrawn from Afghanistan and the strategic importance of Pakistan to the United States was gone. Once the full extent of Pakistan's nuclear weapons development was revealed, economic sanctions (see Pressler amendment) were imposed on the country by several other countries, particularly the US. Having been developed under both Bhutto and Zia, the nuclear development programme had fully matured by the late 1980s. Abdul Qadeer Khan, a metallurgical engineer, greatly contributed to the uranium enrichment programme under both governments. A Q Khan established an administrative proliferation network through Dubai to smuggle URENCO nuclear technology to Khan Research Laboratories. He then established Pakistan's gas-centrifuge program based on the URENCO's Zippe-type centrifuge. Khan is considered to be the founder of Pakistan's HEU-based gas-centrifuge uranium enrichment programme, which was originally launched by PAEC in 1974.

The PAEC also played its part in the success and development of the uranium-enrichment programme by producing the uranium hexafluoride gas feedstock for enrichment. PAEC was also responsible for all the pre- and post-enrichment phases of the nuclear fuel cycle. By 1986 PAEC Chairman Munir Ahmad Khan had begun work on the 50 MW plutonium and tritium production reactor at Khushab, known as Khushab Reactor Complex, which became operational by 1998. After India succeeded with five underground nuclear tests (codename Pokharan-II) in Pokhran region in 1998, Pakistan, to the distaste of the international community, successfully carried out six underground nuclear tests in Ras Koh region of the Chagai Hills on May 28 (codename Chagai-I) and on Kharan region (codename Chagai-II) on May 30, proving Pakistan's nuclear capability. These tests were supervised and observed by physicist Samar Mubarakmand and other senior academic scientists from PAEC and the KRL.

US sanctions
US Senator Pressler introduced the Pressler Amendment, which imposed an embargo on all economic and military aid to Pakistan for developing nuclear weapons. This caused very negative publicity in Pakistan towards the US as many people in Pakistan, and particularly the Pakistani Armed Forces, believed they had been abandoned after they risked a great deal in helping thwart the Soviet Union in Afghanistan. Pakistan was hosting a very large Afghan refugee population and drugs from Afghanistan had infiltrated Pakistan where the use of heroin was growing into a widespread problem.

The embargo continued for five years and in 1995, the Brown Amendment authorised a one-time delivery of US military equipment, contracted for prior to October 1990, worth US$368 million. However, the additional 28 F-16 aircraft costing US$658 million and already paid for by Pakistan were not delivered. Unable to purchase American or NATO weaponry, Pakistan tried to develop a domestic weapons industry, which yielded some successes such as the development of the Al-Khalid Tank and JF-17 Strike Fighter.

Soviet–Afghan War

During the Soviet occupation of neighbouring Afghanistan, the alliance between the United States and Pakistan was greatly strengthened as the US needed Pakistan as a staging area from which to send weapons to the Mujahideens who were fighting the Soviets. Apprehensive of the two-front threat to Pakistan from India and from Soviet-occupied Afghanistan, the United States in 1981 offered a military aid package of over $1.5 billion, which included 40 F-16 fighters, 100 M-48 tanks, nearly 200 artillery guns and over 1,000 TOW anti-tank missiles, which considerably enhanced Pakistan's defence capability. During the course of the war, Pakistan experienced several air intrusions by Afghan/Soviet pilots and claimed to have shot down eight of these aircraft over the years while losing one F-16 from its own fleet.

The Pakistani military, aided by the US and financed by Saudi Arabia, began helping the Mujahideen in setting up training camps and arming them. US President Jimmy Carter had accepted the view that the Soviet aggression was a potential threat to the Persian Gulf region. The uncertain scope of the final objective of Moscow in its sudden southward plunge made the American stake in an independent Pakistan all the more important.

Pakistan's ISI and Special Service Group (SSG) became actively involved in the conflict against the Soviets. The SSG created a unit called the Black Storks who were SSG men dressed as Afghan Mujahideen during the Soviet–Afghan War. They were then flown into Afghanistan and provided the Mujahideen with support. After Ronald Reagan was elected in 1980, US aid for the Mujahideen through Pakistan significantly increased. In retaliation, the KHAD, under Afghan President Mohammad Najibullah, carried out (according to the Mitrokhin archives and other sources) a large number of terrorist operations against Pakistan, which also suffered from an influx of weaponry and drugs from Afghanistan. Pakistan took in 3 million Afghan refugees (mostly Pashtun) who were forced to leave their country. Although the refugees were controlled within Pakistan's largest province, Balochistan, then under martial law ruler General Rahimuddin Khan, the influx of so many refugees – believed to be the largest refugee population in the world – into several other regions had a lasting impact on Pakistan.

PLO and Lebanese weapons captured by the Israelis in their invasion of Lebanon in June 1982 were of Soviet origin and were then covertly transferred into Afghanistan through Pakistan. Later, when American support for the Mujahideen became obvious, Stinger Missiles and other high-technology American weaponry were transferred through Pakistan into Afghanistan. However some of these weapons may have been siphoned off by the ISI for reverse engineering purposes. The arrival of the new high-technology weaponry proved to be quite helpful in organising stiff resistance against the Soviet Union. Many Army regulars fought in Afghanistan along with the resistance and contributed to the withdrawal of Soviet forces from Afghanistan in 1989.

First Gulf War
When Iraq occupied Kuwait, the Saudi government reached an agreement with Pakistan to have several brigades brought into the country to help in its defence. These brigades were placed under the orders of the Ministry of Defense and deployed in Tabuk and Khamis Mushayt.

Taliban takeover of Afghanistan
After the Soviet withdrawal, Pakistan for the first time since 1947, was not concerned about a threat on two fronts. Further, the emergence of five independent Muslim republics in Central Asia raised hopes that they might become allies and offer Pakistan both the political support and the strategic depth it lacked. As long as Afghanistan was in chaos, Pakistan would lack direct access to the new republics.

Fighting between the Communist government in Kabul and the Mujahideen forces continued until 1992 when the Mujahideen forces, led by Ahmed Shah Massoud, removed the Soviet-backed government of Mohammad Najibullah. By 1993, the rival factions who were vying for power agreed on the formation of a government with Burhanuddin Rabbani as president, but infighting continued. Lawlessness was rampant and became a major hindrance to trade between Pakistan and the newly independent Central Asian states. Pakistan appointed the Taliban to protect its trade convoys because most of the Taliban were Pashtun and were trained by the ISI and CIA in the 1980s and could be trusted by Pakistan. With Pakistan's backing, the Taliban emerged as one of the strongest factions in Afghanistan. Pakistan then decided to the end the infighting in Afghanistan and backed the Taliban in their takeover of Afghanistan to bring stability to its western border and establish a pro-Pakistan regime in Kabul.

Pakistan solicited funds for the Taliban, bankrolled Taliban operations, providing diplomatic support as the Taliban's virtual emissaries abroad, arranged training for Taliban fighters, recruited skilled and unskilled manpower to serve in Taliban armies, planned and directed offensives, providing and facilitating shipments of ammunition and fuel, and on several occasions senior Pakistani military and intelligence officers help plan and execute major military operations. By September 1996, the Taliban under the leadership of Mullah Muhammad Omar seized control of Kabul. However, the stability in Afghanistan led Osama bin Laden and Zawahiri to come to Afghanistan, which caused the Taliban to implement a very strict interpretation of Islamic law. The Taliban continued to capture more Afghan territory until by 2001 they controlled 90% of the country.

Siachen Glacier

After the 1971 war, another border flare-up occurred between India and Pakistan in 1984. The area of the dispute was the Siachen Glacier – the world's highest battlefield. The Glacier was under territorial dispute, but in the late 1970s and early 1980s, Pakistan began organising several tourist expeditions to the Glacier. India, irked by this development, mounted Operation Meghdoot, and captured the top of the Glacier by establishing a military base that it still maintains at a cost of more than US$1 million per day. Pakistan tried in 1987 and in 1989 to retake the whole glacier but was unsuccessful.

Pakistan controls the glacial valley five kilometres southwest of Gyong La. The Pakistan Army has been unable to get up to the crest of the Saltoro Ridge, while the Indians cannot come down and abandon their strategic high posts.

The line between where Indian and Pakistani troops are presently holding onto their respective posts is being increasingly referred to as the Actual Ground Position Line (AGPL).

Kargil War

After the failure of the 1989 attempt to re-take the glacier, a new and much more daring plan was developed by the Pakistan Army to re-take the glacier by blocking the Indian supplies reaching the Indian base at the top of the glacier. The plan was ready in the late 1980s but was put on hold due to the fear that this operation could lead to an all-out war with India. Pakistan had recently been placed under US military sanctions for developing nuclear weapons and the Pakistani military hierarchy believed that they did not have the proper military deterrent if the situation escalated.

In the winter of 1998, a modified version of the plan was approved due to the fact that months earlier both India and Pakistan had conducted nuclear tests. Pakistan believed that it now had a working nuclear deterrent and believed that once it had taken the Kargil hills, the international community, fearing a nuclear war, would urge a secession of hostilities. Pakistan would emerge with an improved tactical advantage along the LOC and bring the Siachen Glacier conflict to the forefront of international resolution.

Some elements of the Pakistani SSG Commandos, Northern Light Infantry Forces and Indian Kashmiri militants planned to take over the abandoned Indian bunkers on various hills that overlooked the vital Srinagar–Leh highway that serviced the logistics base from which supplies were ferried through helicopter to the Indian Army at the top of the Siachen Glacier. The Indian Army routinely abandoned the bunkers in the winter due to the cold and snow and re-occupied them in the spring.

The Pakistani-backed forces took over the bunker complex around April and May 1999, but the winter snows had melted earlier than usual and an Indian reconnaissance team sent to inspect the bunkers was wiped out by them. The Indian Army, alerted to the presence of these militants, responded quickly and massed a force of around 30,000 men to re-take the Kargil hills. The Pakistani-backed forces were detected very early in the operation and were not adequately prepared as they still needed another month or so before they properly established themselves on the Kargil hills, as they were short on heavy weaponry, ammunition, food, shelter, and medicine. However Pakistani troops initially managed to retain most of the heights in spite of continuous Indian attacks. Two months into the conflict, Indian troops had slowly retaken most of the ridges that were encroached by the infiltrators; according to official count, an estimated 75–80% of the intruded area and nearly all high ground had returned to Indian control.

Faced with the possibility of international isolation, the already fragile Pakistani economy was weakened further. On 15 June 1999 US President Bill Clinton urged Pakistan Prime Minister Nawaz Sharif through a telephonic conversation to pull his troops out of Kargil. Later on 5 July 1999, Sharif announced withdrawal of Pakistan army from Kargil. The morale of Pakistani forces after the withdrawal also declined. Official counts later suggested a total loss of around 453 soldiers from the Pakistani side and 500 soldiers from the Indian side.

1999–2008

Third military rule
See: 1999 Pakistani coup d'état

Many people in Pakistan blamed Prime Minister Nawaz Sharif for retreating from Kargil under American pressure. Growing fiscal deficits and debt-service payments due to sanctions from nuclear weapon tests in 1998 had led to a financial crisis. When asked about his reason for backing down from Kargil, Sharif said that Pakistan had only enough fuel and ammunition for 3 days and the nuclear missiles were not ready at that time. This comment made many Pakistanis brand Sharif a traitor as Army doctrine called for having at least 45 days of fuel and ammunition and to have nuclear missiles ready.

Fearing that the Army might take over, Sharif attempted to dismiss his own appointed Chairman of Joint Chiefs of Staff Committee General Pervez Musharraf and install an ISI director-general Lieutenant-General Ziauddin Butt as Chief of Army Staff. Musharraf, who was out of the country, boarded a commercial flight to return to Pakistan, but senior army generals refused to accept Musharraf's dismissal. Sharif ordered the Karachi airport to prevent the landing of the airline, which then circled the skies over Karachi. In a coup d'état, the generals ousted Sharif's administration and took over the airport. The plane landed with only a few minutes of fuel, and Musharraf assumed control of the government. Sharif was put under house arrest and later exiled.

The coup d'état was condemned by most world leaders but was mostly supported by Pakistanis. The new military government of Musharraf was heavily criticised in the US, Saudi Arabia, and UK.  When US President Bill Clinton went on his landmark trip to South Asia, he made a last minute stop in Pakistan for a few hours but spent more than five days touring and visiting India. Pakistan was also suspended from the Commonwealth of Nations while Musharraf pledged to clean corruption out of politics and stabilise the economy.

On August 18, 2008, Musharraf resigned as president under impeachment pressure from the coalition government. He was succeeded on September 6, 2008 by Asif Ali Zardari, duly elected as Pakistan's 11th president since 1956.

Standoff with India

A militant attack on the Indian Parliament on December 13, 2001, resulted in the deaths of fourteen people, including the five perpetrators. India claimed that the attacks were carried out by two Pakistan-based militant groups fighting Indian rule in Kashmir – Lashkar-e-Taiba (LeT) and Jaish-e-Mohammad (JeM) – both of whom were backed by Pakistan's (ISI), a charge Pakistan denied. This led to a military standoff between India and Pakistan which amassed troops on either side of the International Border (IB) and along the Line of Control (LoC) in Kashmir. In the Western media, coverage of the standoff focused on the possibility of a nuclear war between the two countries and the implications of the potential conflict on the US-led War on Terrorism. Tensions de-escalated following international diplomatic mediation, which resulted in the October 2002 withdrawal of Indian and Pakistani troops from the International Border.

Military assistance to Sri Lanka

Pakistan and Sri Lanka enjoy a strong relationship and Colombo was used as a refueling stop when India denied Pakistan overflight permissions prior to the Indo-Pakistan war of 1971. Pakistan has sent military advisers, ammunition and other equipment to Sri Lanka during previous offensives against the Liberation Tigers of Tamil Eelam. Many Sri Lankan officers are trained in Pakistan, the cadre which include Sri Lankan President Gotabaya Rajapaksa. In 2000, when a LTTE offensive code-named Operation Ceaseless Waves overran Sri Lankan military positions in the north and captured the Elephant Pass Base and entered Jaffna, and it was being feared that the LTTE would run down thousands of Sri Lankan troops stationed in Jaffna, Pakistan supplied multi-barrel rocket launcher systems and other weaponry, which halted the offensive.

Pakistan, by supplying high-tech military equipment such as 22 Al-Khalid main battle tanks, 250,000 rounds of mortar ammunition and 150,000 hand grenades, and sending army officers to Sri Lanka, played a key role in the ultimate defeat of Tamil Tigers in May 2009.

War in the North-West region

After the September 11 attacks in the United States, Pakistan joined the US-led War on Terror and helped the US military by severing ties with the Taliban and immediately deploying more than 72,000 troops along Pakistan's western border to capture or kill Taliban and al-Qaida militants fleeing Afghanistan.

Pakistan initially garrisoned its troops in military bases and forts in the tribal areas until several high-profile terrorist attacks inside Pakistan and assassination attempts on Pervez Musharraf in May 2004. Musharraf ordered XII Corps and XI Corps to be stationed in Federally Administered Tribal Areas (FATA) region and take forceful action against al-Qaeda members in Pakistan's mountainous Waziristan area (in the FATA), which escalated into armed resistance by local tribesmen. March 2004 marked the beginning of the Battle of Wana in South Waziristan. It was reported that al-Qaeda's second-in-command Ayman al-Zawahiri was amongst these fighters. Pakistan responded to deploy its 10th Mountaineering Division under Major-General Noel Israel. After a week of fighting, the army suffered major casualties with hundreds of fighters being captured. However, army was unable to capture al-Zawahiri who either escaped or was not among the fighters.

Clashes erupted between the Pakistani troops and al-Qaeda and other militants joined by local rebels and pro-Taliban forces. The Pakistani actions were presented as a part of the War on Terrorism, and had connections to the war and Taliban insurgency in Afghanistan. However, the offensive was poorly coordinated and the Pakistan Army suffered heavy casualties and public support for the attack quickly evaporated.

After a 2-year conflict from 2004 until 2006, the Pakistani military negotiated a ceasefire with the Tribesmen from the region in which they pledged to hunt down al-Qaeda members, stop the Talibanization of the region and stop attacks in Afghanistan and Pakistan. However, the militants did not hold up their end of the bargain and began to regroup and rebuild their strength from the previous 2 years of conflict.

The militants, emboldened by their success in FATA, moved into Islamabad where they sought to impose an extremist Sharia government on Pakistan. Their base of operations was the Lal Masjid in Islamabad. After a 6-month standoff, fighting erupted again in July 2007 when the Pakistani Military decided to use force to end the Lal Masjid threat. Once the operation ended, the newly formed Pakistani Taliban, an umbrella group of all militants based out of FATA, vowed revenge and a wave of attacks and suicide bombings erupted all over North-West Pakistan and major Pakistani cities throughout 2007.

The militants then expanded their base of operations and moved into the neighbouring Swat Valley and imposed a very harsh Sharia Law. The Army launched an offensive to re-take the Swat Valley in 2007 but was unable to clear it of the militants who had fled into the mountains and waited for the Army to leave to take over the valley again. The militants then launched another wave of terrorist attacks inside Pakistan.

The Pakistani government and military tried another peace deal with the militants in Swat Valley in 2008. This was roundly criticised in the West as abdicating to the militants. Initially pledging to lay down their arms if Sharia Law was implemented, the Pakistani Taliban used Swat Valley as a springboard to launch further attacks into neighbouring regions and reached to within  of Islamabad.

Public opinion turned decisively against the Pakistani Taliban when a video showed the flogging of a girl by the Pakistani Taliban in Swat Valley. This forced the army to launch a decisive attack against the Taliban occupying Swat Valley in April 2009. After heavy fighting the Swat Valley was largely pacified by July 2009 although isolated pockets of Taliban activity continued.

The next phase of the Pakistan Army's offensive was the formidable Waziristan region. A US drone attack killed the leader of the Pakistani Taliban, Baitullah Mehsud in August in a targeted killing. A power struggle engulfed the Pakistani Taliban for the whole of September but by October a new leader had emerged, Hakimullah Mehsud. Under his leadership, the Pakistani Taliban launched another wave of terrorist attacks throughout Pakistan, killing hundreds of people.

The Pakistan Army had been massing over 30,000 troops and 500 commandos to launch a decisive offensive against the Pakistani Taliban's sanctuaries. After a few weeks of softening up the targets with air strikes, artillery and mortar attacks, the Army moved in a three-pronged attack on South Waziristan. The war ended with a decisive Pakistani victory.

Since the conflict began, Pakistan has lost more than three times the number of its soldiers compared to the number of US troops killed in Afghanistan. However, as of 2009, the confirmed bodycount of militants killed by the Pakistan Army reached 7,000.

UN peacekeeping missions

See also 

 Indo-Pakistani Wars
 Military history of the North-West Frontier
 History of the Pakistan Air Force
 Pakistan and weapons of mass destruction

References

Further reading
 Cloughley, Brian. A History of the Pakistan Army: Wars and Insurrections (4th ed. 2014); 416pp
 
 
 
 Ayub, Muhammad (2005). An Army, its Role and Rule: A History of the Pakistan Army from Independence to Kargil 1947–1999. Pittsburgh: RoseDog Books. .

External links
 Pakistan Military Guide
 Fifty Years of the Pakistan Army
 History of Pak Army